Forbidden Island is a 1959 American film directed by Charles B. Griffith starring Jon Hall.

Forbidden Island may also refer to:
Forbidden Island (album), a 1958 album by Martin Denny
Forbidden Island (TV series), a 1999 American TV series
Forbidden Island (game), a board game published by Gamewright Games in 2010

Islands
Niihau, the westernmost island in Hawaii, United States
Malibu Islet, at the entrance of Princess Louisa Inlet, in British Columbia, Canada